Cyclophora annularis is a moth in the family Geometridae. It is found in Brazil.

References

Moths described in 1875
Cyclophora (moth)
Moths of South America